Tang Dan (born 27 January 1990) is a Chinese xiangqi player. In December 2016, she was China's top-ranking female player with ratings of 2525.

Hailing from Anhui province, she moved to Beijing in 2004 to train under Zhang Qiang. She won her first national championships in 2007. In 2010, she won the gold medal at the Asian Games. She won the Women's World Championship in 2011, 2013 and 2017.

References

1990 births
Living people
Xiangqi players
Xiangqi players at the 2010 Asian Games
Asian Games medalists in xiangqi
Asian Games gold medalists for China
Medalists at the 2010 Asian Games